The Teresa Herrera Trophy is an annual pre-season football tournament hosted by Deportivo La Coruña at the Estadio Riazor.

Established in 1946, it is the third oldest professional football tournament in Spain (behind the "Trofeo Playa y Sol" (1901) and "Copa San Pedro" (1941)). The matches are usually played at Estadio Riazor during the second half of August, and since 1990 the tournament always features local club Deportivo.

History
First played in 1946, the competition originally began as a means to raise money for the poor of the city of A Coruña in Galicia, Northern Spain. The trophy is named in honour of an 18th-century local woman who was famed for her work with the region's poor.

The first match in 1946 was a game between Sevilla and Athletic Club; Sevilla won the match 3–2.

List of champions

 The team that consisted of 23 players from 13 association football clubs established in the A Coruña province.

Women's tournament
Since 2013 a women's football trophy is also held. Until 2016, when Deportivo La Coruña created its women's football section, the tournament was hosted by a local women's team.

The inaugural edition was contested by the two top local teams, second tier Victoria CF and third tier Orzán SD.

In 2014 the match was played in Riazor for the first time, and it featured a foreign opponent, Boavista FC. A qualifier tournament for several local teams was arranged, which was won by defending champion Victoria. Boavista played with old Deportivo uniforms since their own were stolen.

In 2015, Victoria again made it to the Trophy after beating Orzán on penalties, but this time it suffered a crushing defeated against 3-times national champion Rayo Vallecano.

List of champions

Titles by club

Men's tournament

Women's tournament

See also
 Ramón de Carranza Trophy
 Colombino Trophy

Notes

References

External links

 
 Teresa Herrera Trophy at RSSSF

Spanish football friendly trophies
Deportivo de La Coruña
1946 establishments in Spain
Football in Galicia (Spain)
Women's football competitions in Spain